The Communal Reservation Yanesha or Yanesha Community Reserve is a communal reserve in the Palcazu District of Oxapampa Province of Peru. The reserve was creating by law on April 28, 1988, to protect both wild fauna and indigenous peoples. The Yanesha' people live in the reserve.

Fauna
Important indigenous mammals that live within the reserve include red brocket deer (Mazama americana), collared peccary (Tayassu tajacu), white-lipped peccary (Tayassu pecari), nine-banded armadillo (Dasypus novemcinctus), and agouti (Dasyprocta sp.), as well as  monkeys, such as the Ateles sp. and the Lagothrix sp. 

The Spix's guan (Penelope jacquacu) is a bird protected in the reserve, and significant fish species include the boquichico (Prochilodus sp.) the sábalo (Brycon melanopoterum), the palometa (Mylossoma aureum), the doncella (Pseudoplatystoma sp.), and the lisa (Leporinus sp.).

References

Communal reserves of Peru
Indigenous topics of the Amazon
Geography of Pasco Region